Toni Hasenbeck (born August 17, 1971) is an American politician who has served in the Oklahoma House of Representatives from the 65th district since 2018.

Oklahoma House of Representatives
Hasenbeck ran in the 2014 state house election to succeed Joe Dorman as a member of the Democratic Party. She was defeated by Scooter Park, who she successfully primaried in 2018 as a member of the Republican Party, criticizing Park's vote to raise taxes to fund teacher wages. She served in the 57th Oklahoma Legislature and 58th Oklahoma Legislature.

58th Legislature
Women's rights legislation
In April 2021, Rep. Hasenbeck revived a bill by Justin Humphrey that would ban transgender athletes from participating in women's sports. She justified her support using trans exclusionary feminist language saying "this is not an anti-transgender bill at all... this is an absolutely pro-female-athlete bill." Rep. Mauree Turner criticized the legislation saying "denying the existence of trans children is absolutely absurd."

59th Legislature 
After a mid-September 2022 Oklahoma House interim study brought by Hasenbeck, where criminalized survivor April Wilkens's story and others were used to explain the need for new legislation that could give second look resentencing to many currently in Oklahoma prisons, she authored and filed HB 1639 in January 2023—a bill that "would allow a survivor to enter into a lesser sentencing range when evidence of abuse has been substantiated." It "offers nuance in sentencing." and the bill was originally called the Universal Defense Act. The Oklahoma attorney general seems supportive of solutions the bill attempts to address. Hasenbeck has said “For whatever reason women have this problem in the court system that they end up with larger prison sentences then typically the men that were producing the acts to lead to the final act." At least 156 women at Mabel Bassett wrote "letters claiming to have experienced intimate partner violence at the time their crime was committed." Colleen McCarty, who has also worked on the bill, says that legislation is necessary because the parole process has not helped April Wilkens and other women. Wilkens, for example, has never been able to "use the evidence of her domestic abuse in her appeal for early release."

On Wednesday, March 1st, 2023, the bill passed out of the Oklahoma House Judiciary—Criminal Committee unanimously. The Sentencing Project thanked the members for passing the bill out of committee. The committee members included Rande Worthen (chair), Collin Dule, John George, Jason Lowe, Stan May, Lonnie Sims, and Judd Strom. After the bill passed committee, Wilkens was quoted as saying on a phone interview that “So many women in prison with me here have told me just chilling stories about the abuse they’ve suffered too before coming here."

Before and after the bill passed committee, advocates for HB 1639 visited the capitol to speak with legislators and contuct art projects. Though the bill passed committee, Hasenbeck did strike the title of the bill, which allows changes to be made to the language still, so who this applies to is not finalized. A similar bill was passed in California.

References

1971 births
Living people
Republican Party members of the Oklahoma House of Representatives
21st-century American politicians
21st-century American women politicians
Women state legislators in Oklahoma